Gridlock is a 1991 novel by Ben Elton.

Plot summary

The novel depicts a near-future London in which traffic congestion has reached almost critical levels, such that accidents in a few key places could bring the entire city's traffic network to a halt. The government is aware of the problem and plans a major new road-building program to relieve the pressure. The alternative, heavy investment in public mass transport systems such as railways, is ignored because it clashes with the government's ideology. The author argues that this is a highly misguided policy since, in his view, more roads have historically tended to simply generate more traffic and so create an even bigger problem in the long run.

The climax of the book sees shadowy, possibly government-backed forces deliberately instigate the necessary simultaneous accidents which do indeed bring the whole of London to a standstill for several days. The resulting chaos is used as an excuse to press ahead with the road-building scheme.

Allusions/references to actual history, geography and current science
The novel is a satire of Prime Minister Margaret Thatcher's government policies, which emphasised road traffic over rail or other public transportation.

Another major element in the novel revolves round a character with cerebral palsy – he is the inventor of a hydrogen-based power system for cars – green energy – that sinister forces, most likely representing the oil industry, seek to suppress. His disability is aggressive-sympathetically handled, for example he actively embraces the word 'spastic', claiming it back, taking it away from the term of abuse it had become (in the UK) at the time of publication.

References 

1991 British novels
1991 science fiction novels
Dystopian novels
British satirical novels
Novels by Ben Elton
Novels set in London
Novels about transport
Little, Brown and Company books